Iberica is an extinct genus of eobaatarid or a possible plagiaulacid multituberculate which existed in what is now Galve, Spain, during the early Cretaceous (late Hauterivian-early Barremian age). It was first named by Ainara Badiola, José Ignacio Canudo and Gloria Cuenca-Bescós in 2011 and the type species is Iberica hahni.

References

Cretaceous mammals
Multituberculates
Fossil taxa described in 2011
Prehistoric mammals of Europe
Prehistoric mammal genera